Tmarus piger is a species of crab spider belonging to the family Thomisidae.

Taxonomy
The species was first described by Charles Athanase Walckenaer in 1802 as Aranea piger. In the same work he described Aranea bilineata, now regarded as a synonym of this species. In 1805, Walckenaer transferred both species to his new genus Thomisus. In 1875, Eugène Simon made it the type species of his new genus Tmarus.

Description
The carapace is brownish, with a brown-grey band on each sides and small spines. Sometimes it is entirely yellow-brown or black-brown. The abdomen (opisthosoma) is highly variable in colour and markings. Usually it varies from silvery-grey to dark brown with dark or light transverse lines. Sometimes may appears orange-red with a whitish back. It is rather high, V-like compressed, caudally extended, with  a small tubercle on the posterior part. The legs are lightly annulated with dark brown and show short spines arising from black spots. The palpal bulbs of the males, located at the end of the pedipalps, are round to longish oval.

Biology
These rather uncommon crab spiders can be found in spring and summer. Usually they stay on thin branches, stretching the front two pairs of legs. Frequently they catch small ants. The egg cocoon is laid out in a folded leaf of grass.

Distribution and habitat
This species is present in the Palearctic realm, in Europe (Austria, Belarus, Belgium, Bulgaria, Croatia, Czech Republic, France, Germany, Greece, Hungary, Italy, Lithuania, Republic of Moldova, Poland, Portugal, Romania, Slovakia, Slovenia, Spain, Switzerland, The Netherlands, Ukraine and Yugoslavia), Turkey, Caucasus, Kazakhstan, European Russia up to Far East, China, Korea and Japan. These spiders occur in many different habitats, in warm areas, in bogs and swamps, in grasslands, open forests, bushes and hedges. Usually they can be found on leaves, branches, twigs and tree barks, where they are well camouflaged.

References

External links
 Les araignées de Belgique et de France
 Galerie-insecte
 Ukrainian Biodiversity Information Network

Thomisidae
Palearctic spiders
Spiders described in 1802